Hockey club Halytski Levy (since 2017), known before 2017 as Hockey club Levy is a Ukrainian Professional Hockey League club based in Novoiavorivsk, Lviv Oblast. They are a founding member of the Professional Hockey League of Ukraine.

Seasons and records

Season by season results

Note: GP = Games played, W = Wins, OTW = Overtime wins, OTL = Overtime Losses, L = Losses, Pts = Points, GF = Goals for, GA = Goals against

Players

Team captains
  Dmytro Hnitko, 2011– present

Head coaches
  Denis Bulgakov, 2011–2012
  Vladislav Ershov, 2012– present

References

Ice hockey teams in Ukraine
Sport in Lviv
Professional Hockey League teams
Ice hockey clubs established in 2011
2011 establishments in Ukraine